The 2012 Cork Junior A Hurling Championship was the 115th staging of the Cork Junior A Hurling Championship since its establishment by the Cork County Board in 1895. The championship began on 9 September 2012 and ended on 4 November 2012.

On 4 November 2012, Kildorrery won the championship following a 2–8 to 0–13 defeat of Brian Dillons in a final replay at Páirc Uí Rinn. This was their first championship title in the grade.

Brian Dillons' John Horgan was the championship's top scorer with 2-39.

Qualification

Results

First round

Semi-finals

Final

Championship statistics

Top scorers

Overall

In a single game

References

External links
 2012 Cork JAHC results

Cork Junior Hurling Championship
Cork Junior Hurling Championship